Prahlad Pur Bangar is a Village located in Sector 31, Rohini, North West District in the Indian Union Territory of Delhi.

Demographics
 India census, Prahlad Pur (Bangar) had a population of 10,548. Males constitute 56% of the population and females 44%. Prahlad Pur (Bangar) has an average literacy rate of 69%, higher than the national average of 59.5%: male literacy is 76%, and female literacy is 60%. In Prahlad Pur (Bangar), 17% of the population is under 6 years of age. A famous Vaternity hospital in this area.

Martyr Fighter 01st Martyr Fighter of Prahlad Pur village, Mr. Shri Kartar Singh Sindhu, batch no.2648550, 2 Grenadiers, laid supreme sacrifice of his life at the age of just 25 years in the Nathula Operation against China on 11th Sept 1967.  His sacrifice has been recorded in National War Memorial, Delhi at 4C Row.  The resident of Prahladpur Banger have great pride on his Supreme Sacrifice.

02nd Martyr Fighter of Prahlad Pur village, Shri Phulkumar Mann, was martyred in the Indian Army on the post of NCP on 29 July 1976 in the clash with Pakistan in Jammu and Kashmir by making the supreme sacrifice, the village will always remember his sacrifice.

School Govt Sarvodaya Bal Vidyalaya School Id - 131002, it was established in 1952. It is the oldest school in North West Delhi
& now with a High class sports complex.

Famous known grocery shop named - Panna Lal Shop is major part of the city. Famous Chemist shop is Mann Medicos and Naveen Medicos. Famous Hospital - Devansh Multispeciality Hospital.   

Famous personality of village is Anil Mann world champion in wrestling and Satbir singh sindhu also known as babu in village. 

And some tourist attractions are Devta wala temple(300 yrs Old) ; Old Shiv Mandir(200 yrs old) ;Kali Mata temple ; Chotu Ram Park ;Baba shaeb Ambadker Park some facts  also say  that this village has history of more than 800 years

References

Cities and towns in North West Delhi district